The Oak Creek Parkway is an urban park strung along Oak Creek and other parts of South Milwaukee, Wisconsin. It was added to the National Register of Historic Places in 2011.

History
Milwaukee landscape architect Alfred Boerner roughed out plans for the parkway in 1923, but nothing was built until 1930, when federal relief programs made resources available. The parkway was partially built by the Civilian Conservation Corps and the Works Progress Administration of the New Deal.

References

Roads on the National Register of Historic Places in Wisconsin
Parkways in the United States
Geography of Milwaukee County, Wisconsin
Civilian Conservation Corps in Wisconsin
Works Progress Administration in Wisconsin
National Register of Historic Places in Milwaukee County, Wisconsin
Parks on the National Register of Historic Places in Wisconsin